One who is convicted has been found guilty of a crime by a court of law.

Convicted may also refer to:

Psychology 
 Guilt (emotion), an experience induced when a person believes that they have violated moral standards
 Shame, an unpleasant self-conscious emotion associated with a negative evaluation of the self and withdrawal motivations

Film
 The Convicted, a 1927 German silent film
 Convicted (1931 film), an American film directed by Christy Cabanne
 Convicted (1938 film) a Canadian/US film with Rita Hayworth
 Convicted (1950 film), an American film noir directed by Henry Levin
 Convicted (1986 film), an American television film starring John Laroquette
 Convicted (2004 film) or Return to Sender, a film starring Aidan Quinn and Connie Nielsen

Music
 "Convicted", a song by Darkane from Rusted Angel

See also